One from the Heart is a 1982 American musical romantic drama film co-written and directed by Francis Ford Coppola and starring Frederic Forrest, Teri Garr, Raul Julia, Nastassja Kinski, Lainie Kazan, and Harry Dean Stanton. The story is set entirely in Las Vegas. The film was a colossal critical and commercial flop.

Plot summary
The story begins on the evening of the Independence Day in Las Vegas. Hank, a mechanic, and Frannie, a travel agent, break up while celebrating their fifth anniversary. He has been insensitive to her yearning for adventure and excitement. They both spend a night with their idealized partners — Hank goes with Leila, a circus performer, and Frannie goes with Ray, a waiter who passes himself off as a cocktail pianist and singer.

After their mutual nights away from each other, Hank breaks down, tracks Frannie to the motel room she and Ray are in, and abducts Frannie. Frannie refuses to stay with Hank.

Hank follows Frannie to the airport, where Frannie is about to leave for her dream trip to Bora Bora. Hank sings to Frannie to prove he is willing to be more romantic, but Frannie boards the plane. Hank, distraught, goes home and is about to burn Frannie's clothes when Frannie returns, realizing she "made a mistake".

Cast

The director's parents, Carmine and Italia Coppola, appear as a couple in an elevator.

Production
One From the Heart originally was to be financed by MGM, with the studio giving Coppola a record $2 million to direct. Coppola initially rejected the offer, then bought the rights to the property through his Zoetrope Studios, with MGM remaining as a distributor for North America. Zoetrope raised financing via foreign pre-sales and a loan from Chase Manhattan Bank.

Initially, the film was to be a romantic comedy, but Coppola wanted a more ambitious production, raising the film's budget from $15 million to $23 million, paying for miniatures and lavish backgrounds. The film was almost entirely shot on Zoetrope soundstages. Coppola insisted on building sets to add to the artificiality of the proscenium.

However, Zoetrope was struggling to stay afloat, and its staff wound up working on a reduced payroll. The film's tax-shelter investors pulled out, and MGM thus withdrew its support for the project. Eventually, Coppola received support from Canadian businessman Jack Singer, who agreed to lend $8 million to Zoetrope. In February 1981, Paramount Pictures took over as distributor.

Set construction included a replica of part of Las Vegas' McCarran International Airport—complete with a jetway and jet airliner (built from the nose section of a crashed plane)—that was used for the penultimate scene. The sets for the film took up all of the sound-stage space at Coppola's recently acquired American Zoetrope studio.

One from the Heart features an original soundtrack from Crystal Gayle and Tom Waits. Waits received an Academy Award nomination for Best Musical Score. Dean Tavoularis, whose art department was next door to the musical rehearsal space, used Waits' music as tonal inspiration, incorporating it into the film's highly stylized "look". Mickey Hart and musician Bobby Vega also were credited for their contributions to the production.

Coppola used the opportunity to introduce a more economic method of filmmaking. Dubbed the "electronic cinema", it involved shooting and editing a visual storyboard on videotape, allowing for a reference during the actual shooting on film.

Gene Kelly was a dance consultant for the sequence involving Teri Garr and Raul Julia. Kelly disagreed with Coppola over the story the dance was meant to portray. Coppola used his own preference for the theatrical release, although the film's 2003 restoration depicted Kelly’s original idea.

Release
A screening of an unfinished print in San Francisco, California in August 1981 resulted in many exhibitors backing out of showing the film. Paramount decided on a general release in February 1982. The studio also stated that it would hold Oscar-consideration screenings in December 1981, but backed out; Coppola perceived that Paramount wanted to focus on Oscar campaigns for Reds and Ragtime, but the studio insisted that they didn't want to pose a threat to the wide release.

Coppola booked a New York City preview on January 15, 1982 at Radio City Music Hall without the authorization of Paramount. These screenings further soured the relationship between Coppola and Paramount, which was problematic during the arduous shooting and only increased as a result of the poor screening in San Francisco. Paramount ultimately pulled out of the distribution of the film despite the fact that it was booked in theaters throughout America. At almost the last minute, Coppola forged a new deal with Columbia Pictures.

The commercial failure of the film resulted in a decade of financial turmoil for Coppola and his production companies.

Critical reception
As of August 2022, it has a 49% "rotten" rating on Rotten Tomatoes from 35 critics. The critical consensus reads "One from the Heart belies its reputation as a flop with Francis Ford Coppola's earnest intentions and technical virtuosity, but not even the director's ardor for the genre is enough to make audiences feel much for its characters." Janet Maslin in The New York Times described it as an "innovative, audacious effort", but said the film lacked story and tension. In a later interview, Coppola said that the film was still a "work in progress" when screened for blind bidding. He said the unfinished version was "a mess". He went on to say that "it was clear that it wasn't going to get a fair shot."

The film's cinematography has come to be lauded in recent years. In the Los Angeles Times, Susan King praised One from the Heart as "so visually arresting, it's shocking that it wasn't well received back in 1982." Philip French called the film "visually stunning", but also considered it to "[alternate] between the banal and the sublime". Warren Clements of The Globe and Mail stated: "It has the form, style and often the content of a romantic fantasy, but the central love story is between two characters who don't seem to like each other very much. It is a candy with a sour centre."

Box office
The movie grossed $389,249 on its first weekend in 41 theaters, with a total gross of $636,796, against a $26 million budget.

Soundtrack

See also
 List of films set in Las Vegas

References

External links
 
 
 
 
 Original theatrical trailer

1982 films
1980s musical films
American romantic drama films
American romantic musical films
1982 romantic drama films
Films directed by Francis Ford Coppola
Films with screenplays by Francis Ford Coppola
American Zoetrope films
Columbia Pictures films
Films set in the Las Vegas Valley
Films shot in the Las Vegas Valley
Films with screenplays by Armyan Bernstein
1980s English-language films
1980s American films